Zhang Liang is the romanization of common names like 張良, 張亮 and 張梁.

張良
 Zhang Liang (Western Han) (died 189 BC), early Han dynasty strategist
 Zhang Liang, an animation character from the animated TV series The Legend of Qin, based on the above
 Zhang Liang (film director), (born 1933), film director and actor.
 Zhang Liang (author), pseudonym for the author of The Tiananmen Papers

張亮
 Zhang Liang (Tang dynasty) (died 646), general of the Tang dynasty
 Zhang Liang (rower) (born 1987), Chinese rower
 Zhang Liang (cyclist) (born 1983), Chinese Olympic racing cyclist

張梁
 Zhang Liang (2nd-century–184), a Yellow Turban leader, Zhang Jue's brother